In mathematics, the Whitehead manifold is an open 3-manifold that is contractible, but not homeomorphic to   discovered this puzzling object while he was trying to prove the Poincaré conjecture, correcting an error in an earlier paper  where he incorrectly claimed that no such manifold exists.

A contractible manifold is one that can continuously be shrunk to a point inside the manifold itself. For example, an open ball is a contractible manifold. All manifolds homeomorphic to the ball are contractible, too. One can ask whether all contractible manifolds are homeomorphic to a ball. For dimensions 1 and 2, the answer is classical and it is "yes". In dimension 2, it follows, for example, from the Riemann mapping theorem. Dimension 3 presents the first counterexample: the Whitehead manifold.

Construction
Take a copy of  the three-dimensional sphere. Now find a compact unknotted solid torus  inside the sphere. (A solid torus is an ordinary three-dimensional doughnut, that is, a filled-in torus, which is topologically a circle times a disk.) The closed complement of the solid torus inside  is another solid torus.

 

Thus the necessary null-homotopy follows.

Now embed  inside  in the same way as  lies inside  and so on; to infinity.

It follows from our previous observation, the Hurewicz theorem, and Whitehead's theorem on homotopy equivalence, that X is contractible. In fact, a closer analysis involving a result of Morton Brown shows that  However, X is not homeomorphic to  The reason is that it is not simply connected at infinity.

The one point compactification of X is the space  (with W crunched to a point). It is not a manifold. However,  is homeomorphic to 

David Gabai showed that X is the union of two copies of  whose intersection is also homeomorphic to

Related spaces
Each embedding should be an unknotted solid torus in the 3-sphere.

Another variation is to pick several subtori at each stage instead of just one. The cones over some of these continua appear as the complements of Casson handles in a 4-ball.

See also 

 List of topologies
 Tame manifold

References

Further reading

 
 
 
 

3-manifolds
Differential geometry
Geometric topology
Manifolds